Yuki Yamazaki may refer to:

Yuki Yamazaki (footballer), Japanese footballer
Yuki Yamazaki (racewalker), Japanese race walker
 Yuki Yamazaki, a character in the game Hitman